The 1943 All-Ireland Senior Camogie Championship Final was the twelfth All-Ireland Final and the deciding match of the 1943 All-Ireland Senior Camogie Championship, an inter-county camogie tournament for the top teams in Ireland.

Dublin dominated the game and won with 8 goals, including three by Doreen Rogers and two by E. Mulcahy.

References

All-Ireland Senior Camogie Championship Final
All-Ireland Senior Camogie Championship Final, 1943
All-Ireland Senior Camogie Championship Final
All-Ireland Senior Camogie Championship Finals
Dublin county camogie team matches